Jose Junior Pereira Ailton (born July 23, 1987), better known as Aílton Júnior, is a Brazilian football player who most recently played for Azerbaijan Premier League side AZAL.

Career

Brasil 
Aílton passed a football school of Santos FC and began his career here, but was not able to become a major player. In 2007, at the age of 20 he went to Tupi FC and played Série C for the next 2 years.

Hungary 
He was transferred to Kaposvári Rákóczi FC and after a brilliant season was signed by Ferencvárosi TC. In 2010, he played for the second team on a one-year loan, but was taken back after six months. For Ferencvárosi TC he capped 41 times.

AZAL 
In July 2012, Aílton went on trial with Azerbaijan Premier League side AZAL. Following his first friendly match with the team he signed a two-year contract. Aílton was released by AZAL at the end of his contract, having played 57 times in all competitions for the club.

Career statistics

References

External links

Player profile at HLSZ 
Player profile at FTC 
VIDEO 1 
VIDEO 2 
VIDEO 3 

1987 births
Living people
Footballers from São Paulo (state)
Brazilian footballers
Association football defenders
Santos FC players
Ferencvárosi TC footballers
AZAL PFK players
Nemzeti Bajnokság I players
Azerbaijan Premier League players
Brazilian expatriate footballers
Expatriate footballers in Hungary
Brazilian expatriate sportspeople in Hungary
Expatriate footballers in Azerbaijan
Brazilian expatriate sportspeople in Azerbaijan